Protoginella is a genus of sea snails, marine gastropod mollusks in the subfamily Austroginellinae of the family Marginellidae, the margin snails.

Species
According to the World Register of Marine Species (WoRMS), the following species with valid names are included within the genus Protoginella :
 † Protoginella atkinsoni (May, 1922) 
 † Protoginella bellensis (Beu, 1970) 
 † Protoginella bembix P. A. Maxwell, 1988 
 Protoginella caledonica Boyer, 2001
 † Protoginella cenodoxa P. A. Maxwell, 1992 
 † Protoginella conica (G. F. Harris, 1897) 
 † Protoginella corpulenta (May, 1922) 
 Protoginella laseroni Boyer, 2001
 Protoginella lavigata (Brazier, 1877)
 Protoginella maestratii Boyer, 2002
 † Protoginella micula (Tate, 1878) 
 † Protoginella opoitia (Marwick, 1965)
 Protoginella praetera Laseron, 1957
 Protoginella reborai T. Cossignani, 2011
 Protoginella turbiniformis (Bavay, 1917)
 † Protoginella wentworthii (Tate, 1877) 
 † Protoginella whitecliffensis (Marwick, 1926) 
Synonyms
 Protoginella geminata (Hedley, 1912): synonym of Alaginella geminata (Hedley, 1912)
 † Protoginella labinensis P. A. Maxwell, 1988: synonym of † Alaginella labinensis (P. A. Maxwell, 1988) 
 † Protoginella parvisinus P. A. Maxwell, 1992: synonym of † Alaginella parvisinus (P. A. Maxwell, 1992) 
 Protoginella valida (R. B. Watson, 1886): synonym of Alaginella valida (R. B. Watson, 1886)
 Protoginella weedingi (Cotton, 1944): synonym of Alaginella geminata (Hedley, 1912)

References

 Cossignani T. (2006). Marginellidae & Cystiscidae of the World. L'Informatore Piceno. 408pp.

Marginellidae